The Hungary national women's rugby union team are the national women's rugby union team of Hungary. They have thus far only played in sevens tournaments and they have yet to qualify for the Women's Rugby World Cup.

On 5 April 2010 they won the ENTC (Emerging Nations Training Camp) Test European Championship 7s which was held in the village of Zánka, Hungary. They beat Poland 24-0 in the final.

On 2014 they won the European Division B tournament which was held in the Lithuanian capital, Vilnius. They beat Serbia 43-0 and Luxemburg with 47-0, and they won against Israel with 35-12 at the semi-finals. They won the finals against Lithuania with 40-5.

Results

2010

Current squad
The squad for the 2010 ENTC Test European Championship 7s:
Mária Gyolcsos
Csilla Fehér
Noémi Kis
Beáta Szalai
Brigitta Kiss
Anita Deák
Zsuzsanna Jakab
Beatrix Sólyom
Anett Pintér
Veronika Kovács
Aliz Krizsák
Katalin Huszti
Judit Kovács

References

External links
  Magyar Rögbi Szövetség - Official Site

Women's national rugby union teams
European national women's rugby union teams
Rugby